The Piarist School is a private, Roman Catholic college preparatory school in Hagerhill, Kentucky. It is operated by The Piarist Fathers (Piarists) independent of and with the blessing and spiritual support of the Roman Catholic Diocese of Lexington. The present school is the second location for the Piarist School which began in 1990 in Martin, Kentucky.

Background
The Piarist School is a small, tuition-free college preparatory school serving students in Floyd, Knott, Pike, Johnson, Lawrence, and Magoffin counties of Kentucky since 1990. The original 1994 graduating class consisted of only three seniors. Today an approximately 52 students in grades 7-12 attend the school. Students must pass an entrance examination, which is administered in the Spring, before being admitted to the School.

During the spring of 1988, the Provincial Chapter of the American Province of the Piarist Fathers voted to send two priests to work in Appalachia to pursue the work of the Piarists in the field of education. The initial contact person in the newly formed Diocese of Lexington was Monsignor Ralph Briting. He was the creator of a project to evangelize eastern Kentucky called the Christian Appalachian Project (CAP). Rev. Thomas Carroll, Sch.P. arrived in Prestonsburg, Kentucky on September 12, 1988 and initially stayed at the rectory at St. Martha Parish, and he was later joined by Rev. David Powers, Sch.P. who also went to eastern Kentucky to work in the newly established diocese of Lexington. There was a school building located next to Mountain Christian Academy in Martin, that was closed, and the Piarist Fathers agreed to rent that building from The Christian Appalachian Project for a nominal yearly amount. From the very beginning, the school was tuition-free. To pay the expenses, the fathers relied on grants, donations, and income from making mission calls. The Piarist School opened in August 1990 to serve all those desiring a quality education within a Christian setting. They were joined in February 1991 by Rev. Leonard Gendernalik, Sch.P. and later in 1992 by Rev. Stephen Bendik, Sch.P. All four Piarist Fathers had previously been teaching at Devon Preparatory School in Devon, Pennsylvania.

Taking into account the extreme poverty of the people and keeping the charisma of St. Joseph Calasanz in mind, the Piarists decided the school would be tuition-free and dependent on the charitable contributions of the people of God for its existence.

The Piarist School opened with one freshman class and three priests. It added a class each year until the 1993-1994 school year, when the school had its first four-year program. Then on May 28, 1994 the school graduated its first class of three seniors:  Leigh Ann Blackburn, Duran Bryant, and Brandon Scott. One notable Piarist alumnae is Dr. Nora Traum '01, who is an assistant professor in the Department of Economics at North Carolina State University. Another notable alumnae is Dr. Monica Majmundar Sheth, M.D. '98 who attended Transylvania University and went on to get her Medical Degree from Emory University. She is currently a physician with North Shore LU Health System with a speciality in Diagnostic Radiology.

Today, The Piarist School is accredited by the Kentucky Department of Non-Public Schools and is a member of the Kentucky High School Athletic Association. The School also offers a good selection of extracurricular activities including Student Council, National Honor Society, Academic Team, Spanish Club, Chess Club, Drama Club, Science Olympiad, and Knights for Christ. The School also provides free transportation for those students living in certain areas of need it. Since its first graduating class, 100 percent of all graduates have attended college, many having received significant scholarships. In 2009, the Piarist School began a middle school program by adding the seventh and eighth grade to the high school program. It added a sixth grade the following year.  The school moved from its Martin location to the present location 
in Johnson County at the completion of the 2014-2015 school year, and ended its sixth grade program after the 2015-2016.

Besides the Academic component, The School also has an Outreach Program to the poor. The School website states that "Piarist Outreach completes the mission of the school. It complements the School's academic endeavors, and the Outreach Program connects those in need in Eastern Kentucky with the help offered by others throughout The United States." The Outreach Program is currently led by Mrs. Audrey Collins. Throughout the year, numerous benefactors send gifts of clothing, canned food, school supplies, Christmas gifts and other needed items. The Program provides school supplies to the Piarist School students as well as to many public school Family Resource Centers, and Mrs. Collins works with numerous churches and local social service organizations to distribute the food and clothing to the needy. Each year the Outreach Program, assisted by numerous groups, provides Christmas gifts to hundreds of underprivileged children from three different counties. This program is expanding each year.

The school also hosts a number of volunteer groups who come to eastern Kentucky in order to repair and paint houses, build wheelchair ramps and complete other projects as needed. These volunteers are usually housed at The Oddfellows Youth Camp in Prestonsburg, at which Mrs. Collins serves as the volunteer caretaker. But perhaps the most telling facet of the Outreach Program is the number of parishes and volunteers wanting to work with the School from around the country. Numerous parishes contact Mrs. Collins to coordinate donations for both the School's students as well as the people of the surrounding area, or to coordinate the services of those volunteers who travel to the area and work hard on projects that benefit the people served by the Program. Such services include providing food, clothing, assistance to burn-out victims, school supplies, Christmas presents, household items to needy families, and the operation of a Summer Emergency Home Repair Project. Volunteer groups usually spend a week working on various Outreach projects.

The Mission Statement of The Piarist School is that "The Piarist School provides a college preparatory education, involving the development of an educational community which includes parents, teachers, students, and members of the local community as co-workers in promoting the physical, intellectual, and spiritual growth of the students. The School is not just a place for the conveyance of subject matter to objects to be educated, but is one where the creativity needed for continuous renewal of society thrives and where formal and in-formal education are so integrated that the School becomes a center for social and cultural activities."

Athletics
Due in large part to the efforts of the School's first Athletic Director Theresa Kelly, who taught French at the School and was a two-time Three Rivers Conference Cross-Country Coach of the Year, The Piarist School has been able to augment its academic educational opportunities with athletic ones. Over the years, the School has fielded a golf team, a cross country team, a softball team, and a dance team. The School currently offers high school and middle school girls volleyball and high school boys and girls basketball.

The School's first league conference championship was winning the 2001 Three Rivers Conference in golf under coach Kenneth Rose. The School's fifth athletic director was Greg Friend, and he expanded the School's athletic program to include girls volleyball. Current Volleyball Coach Darlene Moore began coaching in 2006. Since 2008, the VolleyKnights has advanced to the second round of the 58th District Tournament. The high school VolleyKnights won the Three Rivers Conference Championship in 2009, 2010, and 2011, and the middle school VolleyKnights won the Floyd County C-Team Championship in 2011. The high school Volleyball team has also had two players named to the All State Team.

In 2008, Kevin Tackett became the new athletic director as well as the boys and girls basketball coach. The girls basketball team won the Three Rivers Conference Basketball Championship in 2009. During the 2012-13 season, the Lady Knights defeated South Floyd High School for their first district win in school history. In October 2009, Coach Tackett organized his first MidKnight Madness, which is the school's big annual pep rally. Several Piarist School athletes have been signed to play for college athletic teams, many with significant scholarships.

Notes and references
The Piarist Fathers in the U.S.A. 60 Years of Service by Jose P. Burgues, Sch.P., Miami, 2007-2008

The Piarist School Self-Study For the Kentucky Non-Public School Commission, April 2013

The Piarist School Student Handbook, 2012-2013

ACT Report, June 29, 2011

External links
 School Website
  New School Website
  School Facebook Page
   Piarist Provincial Website

Educational institutions established in 1990
Piarist Order
Roman Catholic Diocese of Lexington
Catholic secondary schools in Kentucky
Schools in Johnson County, Kentucky
1990 establishments in Kentucky